Munīruzzamān Khān Islāmābādī (1875-1950), also known by the epithet Biplobi Maulana, was a Muslim philosopher, nationalist activist and journalist from Islamabad (now known as Chittagong) in Bengal Presidency, British India (present-day Bangladesh). He was among the founders of the Jamiat Ulama-e-Hind.

Early life 
Maniruzzaman Khan Islamabadi was born into a Bengali Muslim family in Araliar Char village under Barama union in Patiya Upazila (present Chandanaish Upazila) of Chittagong district. As he became older, he taught at various traditional madrassas.

Career

Journalism and writing 
Islamabadi began his career as a journalist by editing or managing Muslim reformist periodicals such as the Soltan (1901), Hablul Matin (1912), and journals such as Mohammadi (1903), The Kohinoor (1911), Basona (1904) and Al-Eslam (1913). He organised literary conferences at Chittagong in 1922 and 1930 amidst pomp and grandeur. One such conference under the banner of "Chittagong Literary Society" was chaired by Rabindranath Tagore.

Political activism 
Islamabadi's activism started in 1904 with the "Islam Mission Samity" which had undertaken a course of action to preach awareness among Bengali Muslims of their cultural heritage. Referring to the uneducated mullahs' reservation about learning geography on the baseless ground that the subject was created by the "Kafir English," Islamabadi wrote: 

Islamabadi supported the Indian National Congress and took an active part in the movement for the annulment of the Partition of Bengal. He also participated actively in the Non-cooperation Movement and Khilafat Movement and was the President of the provincial Congress Committee. He, along with Mohammad Akram Khan toured throughout Bengal and organised Khilafat meetings, particularly in Dhaka and Chittagong. In an article titled Asahojogita-o-Amader Kartbya, Islamabadi declared that to protect Khilafat and to acquire Swaraj were the twin aims of the Khilafat movement. He was among the founders of the Jamiat Ulama-e-Hind, and was appointed a member of its first executive council.

He was one of the architects of the Bengal Pact of 1923. He left Congress politics in the 1930s and joined the Krishak Praja Party and was elected to the Bengal Legislative Assembly in 1937 from this party.

Anjuman-i-Ulama-i-Bangala 
In 1913, Moniruzzaman Islamabadi along with Maulana Abul Kalam Azad, Mohammad Akram Khan, Maulana Abdullahil Baqi and Dr Muhammad Shahidullah led the organising of the Anjuman-i-Ulama-i-Bangala with headquarters in Kolkata. One of the objectives of this organisation was popularising Bengali language among the Muslim middle class. When the Anjuman-i-Ulama-i-Bangala merged into Jamiat Ulema-e-Hind, in 1921, he became the founder of its branch in Bengal, the Jamiat-i-Ulama-i-Bangalah. He founded the Chittagong branch of the organisation and himself became its president.

Through the Anjuman, Islamabadi addressed social ills that plagued the Muslim society like dowry, excessive mahr and young child marriage, without registering the age of consent. Due to its involvement Islamabadi's involvement with the Krishak Praja Party, the Anjuman viewed the Muslim League as repugnant, lacking religiosity and "not being true Muslims." However, by the 1930s the organisation became too innocent of the reality of a "dissociation of modernity and democracy" and many of its members, including  Mohammad Akram Khan abandoned the organisation and joined the Muslim League. This made Islamabadi a lonely voice, and he suffered from depression.

Death and legacy 
He was a critic of the Pakistan movement and lived his life at Kolkata after the partition of India, where he died.

Islamabadi was a preacher who wanted to give Bengali Muslims a new identity by purifying the modern and invoking universal morality. He wanted to establish an Islamic university in Chittagong but the lack of funds and circumstances of the time did not favour his efforts.

Works 
Islamabadi's main objective to project the past glory of Islam, its contributions to the progress of human civilisation and thus inspiring the Bengali Muslims to change their conditions manifested in publications such as:
 Bhugol Shastre Musalman (Muslim contributions in geographical science)
 Khagol Shastre Musalman (Muslim contributions in astronomy)
  Korane Swadhinatar Bani (Messages of freedom in the Qur’an)
 Bharate Islam Prachar (Spreading of Islam in India)
  Musalman Amale Hindur Adhikar (Rights of the Hindus in Muslim Rule)
 Muslim Birangana (Heroic Muslim women)
 Turashker Sultan (Sultan of Turkey)
 Aurangzeb
 Nizamuddin Aulia

References

Bengali Muslim scholars of Islam
1875 births
1950 deaths
Bengali politicians
Bengali-language writers
20th-century Bengalis
Bengali writers
Krishak Sramik Party politicians
People from Chittagong
Founders of Jamiat Ulama-e-Hind
Bengal MLAs 1937–1945
Journalists from West Bengal